Noel Tierney (born 2 February 1942 in Milltown, County Galway) is an Irish former Gaelic footballer who played for his local club Milltown and at senior level for the Galway county team that won three consecutive All-Ireland Senior Football Championships from 1964 until 1966 inclusive.

Tierney was a member of the Galway All-Ireland Minor Football Championship winning team of 1960, a team which included a number of future three-in-a-row panelists. He won a National Football League with Galway in 1965, as well as winning two Railway Cup medals with Connacht in 1967 and again in 1969, when he captained the team.

He won two Cú Chulainn Awards (an early All Stars Award) and he also won Texaco Footballer of the Year in 1964. In 1993, he was inducted into the Galway Football Hall of Fame. He was selected at full-back on the Galway Football Team of the Millennium in 1999.

Honours
Galway
Connacht Minor Football Championship : 2 (1959, 1960)
All-Ireland Minor Football Championship : 1 (1960)
Connacht Senior Football Championship : 5 (1963, 1964, 1965, 1966, 1968)
All-Ireland Senior Football Championship : 3 (1964, 1965, 1966)
Runner-up : 1 (1963)
National Football League : 1 (1965)
Milltown
Galway North-Board Minor Football Championship : 1 (1960)
Galway Junior Football Championship : 1 (1961)
Galway Senior Football Championship : 1 (1971)
Runner-up : 1 (1967)
Connacht
Railway Cup : 2 (1967, 1969; capt.)
Individual
Cú Chulainn Award : 2 (1963, 1964)
Texaco Footballer of the Year : 1 (1964)
Galway Football Hall of Fame Inductee : 1993
Galway Football Team of the Millennium : 1884-1999

References

1942 births
Living people
Dairy farmers
Gaelic football backs
Galway inter-county Gaelic footballers
Irish farmers
Milltown Gaelic footballers